3-Hydroxy-3-methylglutaryl-CoA lyase deficiency is an uncommon inherited disorder in which the body cannot properly process the amino acid leucine. Additionally, the disorder prevents the body from making ketones, which are used for energy during fasting.

Presentation
This disorder usually appears within the first year of life. The signs and symptoms of HMG-CoA lyase deficiency include vomiting, dehydration, lethargy, convulsions, and coma. When episodes occur in an infant or child, blood sugar becomes extremely low (hypoglycemia), and harmful compounds can build up and cause the blood to become too acidic (metabolic acidosis). These episodes are often triggered by an infection, fasting, strenuous exercise, or sometimes other types of stress.

Cause
Mutations in the HMGCL gene cause 3-hydroxy-3-methylglutaryl-CoA lyase deficiency. The enzyme made by the HMGCL gene plays an essential role in breaking down dietary proteins and fats for energy. Specifically, the enzyme is responsible for processing leucine, an amino acid that is part of many proteins. This enzyme also produces ketones during the breakdown of fats. If a mutation in the HMGCL gene reduces or eliminates the activity of this enzyme, the body is unable to process leucine or make ketones properly. A lack of ketones leads to hypoglycemia, and compounds called organic acids (which are formed as products of amino acid and fat breakdown) can cause the blood to become too acidic. Metabolic acidosis and hypoglycemia impair tissue function, especially in the central nervous system.

Diagnosis

Differential diagnosis
This condition is sometimes mistaken for Reye syndrome, a severe disorder that develops in children while they appear to be recovering from viral infections such as chicken pox or flu. Most cases of Reye syndrome are associated with the use of aspirin during these viral infections.

Epidemiology
Less than 20 patients with MGA type I have been reported in the literature (Mol Genet Metab. 2011 Nov;104(3):410-3. Epub 2011 Jul 26.)

See also
 3-hydroxy-3-methylglutaryl-CoA lyase

References

This article incorporates public domain text from The U.S. National Library of Medicine

External links 

Amino acid metabolism disorders
Cholesterol and steroid metabolism disorders